Louis K. Meisel (born 1942 in Brooklyn, New York) is an American author, art dealer and proponent of the photorealist art movement, having coined the term in 1969. He is also the owner of one of the earliest art galleries in SoHo at 141 Prince Street. In addition to Photorealism, Meisel is responsible for the resurgence of interest in the sub-set of American illustration identified as "Pin-up", and is the largest collector of original art of both genres. Louis and Susan Meisel  own the largest collections of Photorealism and pin-up art in the world.

Photorealism
Photorealism as defined by Meisel is the creation of paintings fashioned in such a way as to appear to be photographs in their finished forms. Meisel defined the qualities of photorealist as one who:

  The photorealist uses the camera and photograph to gather information.
  The photorealist uses a mechanical or semimechanical means to transfer the information to the canvas.
  The photorealist must have the technical ability to make the finished work appear photographic.
  The artist must have exhibited work as a photorealist by 1972 to be considered one of the central photorealists.
  The artist must have devoted at least five years to the development and exhibition of photorealist work.

Published works
Meisel has published sixteen books on the topic of photorealism as well as pin up art, including:

Nathan Wasserberger (1964)
Photorealism (1980) 
Richard Estes: The Complete Paintings, 1966-1985 (1986) 
Charles Bell: The Complete Works 1970-1990 (1991) 
Photorealism Since 1980 (1993) 
The Great American Pin-Up (1996) 
Pin-Up Poster Book: The Edward Runci Collection (1997) 
Clarice Cliff:The Bizarre Affair (1998) 
Photorealism at the Millennium (2002) 
Mel Ramos Pop Art Fantasies: The Complete Paintings (2004) 
Gil Elvgren: All His Glamorous American Pin-Ups  (2008) 
Photorealism In The Digital Age (2013) 

In addition to the above, Meisel has contributed to dozens of art magazines and is a member of the Authors Guild.

The Louis K. Meisel Gallery
The Louis K. Meisel Gallery exhibits and sells the works of prominent photorealist artists such as:

 John Baeder
 Robert Bechtle
 Charles Bell
 Roberto Bernardi
 Tom Blackwell
 Tony Brunelli
 Hilo Chen
 Chuck Close
 Robert Cottingham
 Don Eddy
 Richard Estes
 Audrey Flack
 Robert Gniewek
 Ralph Goings
 Clive Head
 Don Jacot
 John Kacere
 Ron Kleemann
 Richard McLean
 Bertrand Meniel
 Robert Neffson
 John Salt
 Raphaella Spence
 Bernardo Torrens

Classical music
Meisel also promotes classical music artists and is on the boards of Pro Musicis and Concert Artists Guild.  Meisel and his wife Susan present over 30  classical music salon concerts at the Louis K. Meisel Gallery and at other venues such as Lincoln Center Carnegie Hall the Parrish Art Museum in Watermill, New York.

References
Notes

External links
 The Louis K. Meisel Gallery

1942 births
American art dealers
Living people
Photorealist artists